Leland Wayne Gift (October 21, 1915 – February 13, 1998) was an American football quarterback who played one season with the Cleveland Rams of the National Football League. He played college football at Purdue University where he was a member of Sigma Pi fraternity.  He attended Canton McKinley High School in Canton, Ohio.  During World War II he served in the United States Navy.

Professional career
Gift played in ten games, starting one, for the Cleveland Rams in 1937.

Coaching career
Gift was an assistant coach for the Brooklyn Dodgers of the All-America Football Conference during the 1947 season.

References

External links
Just Sports Stats

1915 births
1998 deaths
American football quarterbacks
Brooklyn Dodgers (AAFC) coaches
Cleveland Rams players
Purdue Boilermakers football players
People from Medina, Ohio
Players of American football from Ohio
United States Navy personnel of World War II